Liam Bradley may refer to:
Liam Bradley, commonly known by his nickname Baker, Irish former Gaelic football manager and player
Liam Bradley (musician) (born 1943), Australian musician and composer
Liam Bradley, Irish musician member of the Irish band Beoga